The Bayer designation ν Lyrae is shared by two stars in the constellation Lyra:
ν1 Lyrae (8 Lyrae)
ν2 Lyrae (9 Lyrae), sometimes simply called ν Lyrae

Eridani, Nu
Lyra (constellation)